Sólo Para Fanáticos is a compilation album (fifteenth overall) set by Latin American Mexican rock band Maná. This album is a re-packaging of their titular debut album, Maná.

Track listing

See also
Maná Re-releases

Maná compilation albums
2002 compilation albums